A Kelvin wave is a wave in the ocean or atmosphere that balances the Earth's Coriolis force against a topographic boundary such as a coastline, or a waveguide such as the equator. A feature of a Kelvin wave is that it is non-dispersive, i.e., the phase speed of the wave crests is equal to the group speed of the wave energy for all frequencies. This means that it retains its shape as it moves in the alongshore direction over time.

A Kelvin wave (fluid dynamics) is also a long scale perturbation mode of a vortex in superfluid dynamics; in terms of the meteorological or oceanographical derivation, one may assume that the meridional velocity component vanishes (i.e. there is no flow in the north–south direction, thus making the momentum and continuity equations much simpler). This wave is named after the discoverer, Lord Kelvin (1879).

Coastal Kelvin wave

In a stratified ocean of mean depth H, perturbed by some amount η, free waves propagate along coastal boundaries (and hence become trapped in the vicinity of the coast itself) in the form of internal Kelvin waves on a scale of about 30 km.  These waves are called coastal Kelvin waves, and have propagation speeds of approximately 2 m/s in the ocean.  Using the assumption that the cross-shore velocity v is zero at the coast, v = 0, one may solve a frequency relation for the phase speed of coastal Kelvin waves, which are among the class of waves called boundary waves, edge waves, trapped waves, or surface waves (similar to the Lamb waves).  The (linearised) primitive equations then become the following:

 the continuity equation (accounting for the effects of horizontal convergence and divergence):

 the u-momentum equation (zonal wind component):

 the v-momentum equation (meridional wind component):

If one assumes that the Coriolis coefficient f is constant along the right boundary conditions and the zonal wind speed is set equal to zero, then the primitive equations become the following:

 the continuity equation:

 the u-momentum equation:

 the v-momentum equation:

.

The solution to these equations yields the following phase speed: c2 = gH, which is the same speed as for shallow-water gravity waves without the effect of Earth's rotation.  It is important to note that for an observer traveling with the wave, the coastal boundary (maximum amplitude) is always to the right in the northern hemisphere and to the left in the southern hemisphere (i.e. these waves move equatorward – negative phase speed – on a western boundary and poleward – positive phase speed – on an eastern boundary; the waves move cyclonically around an ocean basin).

Equatorial Kelvin wave

The equatorial zone essentially acts as a waveguide, causing disturbances to be trapped in the vicinity of the Equator, and the equatorial Kelvin wave illustrates this fact because the Equator acts analogously to a topographic boundary for both the Northern and Southern Hemispheres, making this wave very similar to the coastally-trapped Kelvin wave.  The primitive equations are identical to those used to develop the coastal Kelvin wave phase speed solution (U-momentum, V-momentum, and continuity equations) and the motion is unidirectional and parallel to the Equator.  Because these waves are equatorial, the Coriolis parameter vanishes at 0 degrees; therefore, it is necessary to use the equatorial beta plane approximation that states:

where β is the variation of the Coriolis parameter with latitude.  This equatorial beta plane assumption requires a geostrophic balance between the eastward velocity and the north–south pressure gradient.  The phase speed is identical to that of coastal Kelvin waves, indicating that the equatorial Kelvin waves propagate toward the east without dispersion (as if the earth were a non-rotating planet).  For the first baroclinic mode in the ocean, a typical phase speed would be about 2.8 m/s, causing an equatorial Kelvin wave to take 2 months to cross the Pacific Ocean between New Guinea and South America; for higher ocean and atmospheric modes, the phase speeds are comparable to fluid flow speeds.

When the motion at the Equator is to the east, any deviation toward the north is brought back toward the Equator because the Coriolis force acts to the right of the direction of motion in the Northern Hemisphere, and any deviation to the south is brought back toward the Equator because the Coriolis force acts to the left of the direction of motion in the Southern Hemisphere. Note that for motion toward the west, the Coriolis force would not restore a northward or southward deviation back toward the Equator; thus, equatorial Kelvin waves are only possible for eastward motion (as noted above). Both atmospheric and oceanic equatorial Kelvin waves play an important role in the dynamics of El Nino-Southern Oscillation, by transmitting changes in conditions in the Western Pacific to the Eastern Pacific.

There have been studies that connect equatorial Kelvin waves to coastal Kelvin waves.  Moore (1968) found that as an equatorial Kelvin wave strikes an "eastern boundary", part of the energy is reflected in the form of planetary and gravity waves; and the remainder of the energy is carried poleward along the eastern boundary as coastal Kelvin waves.  This process indicates that some energy may be lost from the equatorial region and transported to the poleward region.

Equatorial Kelvin waves are often associated with anomalies in surface wind stress. For example, positive (eastward) anomalies in wind stress in the central Pacific excite positive anomalies in 20 °C isotherm depth which propagate to the east as equatorial Kelvin waves.

Recently, equatorial Kelvin waves were shown to be a case of classical topologically protected excitations,  similar to those found in a topological insulator.

See also

 Rossby wave
 Rossby-gravity waves
 Equatorial Rossby wave
 Kelvin–Helmholtz instability
 Edge wave
 Tropical wave

References

External links
Overview of Kelvin waves from the American Meteorological Society.
US Navy page on Kelvin waves.
Slideshow at utexus.edu about Kelvin waves. 
Kelvin Wave Renews El Niño - NASA, Earth Observatory, image of the day, 2010 March 21

Gravity waves
Tropical meteorology
Atmospheric dynamics
Fluid mechanics
Wave